The International Year of Shelter for the Homeless (IYSH) was recognized in 1987 by the United Nations. It was first declared, in principle, in UN resolution 36/71 in 1981, and proclaimed officially in 1982 in resolution 37/221. It was mainly aimed at improving shelter / housing for the poor in general (and not just homeless people), especially in developing countries. It was also a follow-up to the Habitat I conference in 1976.

Actions 

In several countries, national actions were created, such as Australia which created an IYSH Secretariat, or the United Kingdom where a trust was created to collect donations from housing associations for shelter projects in developing countries, with some projects part-funded by the Overseas Development Administration. The trust later evolved into the NGO Homeless International (now operating as Reall, or Real Equity for All).

Legacy 

The World Habitat Awards were created by the BSHF as their contribution to the IYSH. Two other prizes were created by the Japan Housing Association as awards to deserving housing projects, the IYSH Memorial Prize in 1988 and the IYSH Memorial Encouragement Prize in 2006.

References 

1987 in international relations
Shelter for the Homeless
Homelessness